Haikou Tower, or Haikou Tower 1, is an under-construction supertall skyscraper on Guoxing Avenue, Haikou, Hainan, China. It will be the tallest in a suite of ten buildings on a site called Haikou Towers or Hainan International Exchange Square.

The project will consist of a group of ten buildings, five on the north side of Guoxing, and five on the south. The grounds total 387,669 square metres.

The project began on September 28, 2015 and is expected to be completed sometime between 2020 and 2027.

Description

The site
The site, named Haikou Towers or Hainan International Exchange Square, is located on Guoxing Avenue directly west of Haifu Road. It is divided into two parts: one running along the north side of Guoxing and the other of similar size and shape on the south side. Each part will contain five buildings: two small buildings at the west, a central tower, and two small buildings at the east. The south part will have the tallest building called 'Haikou Tower 1'.

The ten buildings will range from 150 to 450 metres high with an overall building area of 1.5 million square metres.

Main tower
The main tower, named Haikou Tower 1 will have 94 floors above ground and 2 below, served by 51 elevators. The top, hotel portion of the tower will have a central void.

The lower two-thirds of the building will contain 185,000 square metres of office space. The top portion will be  46,000 square metres of office space.

The tower will contain 356 apartments and 288 hotel rooms. A total of 1,952 parkings spaces will be available.

Floor usage
The floors are designed to be used as follows:

Offices: 7 to 66
Gym/pool and other hotel-related facilities: 69-71
Hotel lobby: 72
Hotel rooms: 73 to 100
Bar/restaurant: 101
Observatory: 103

Timeline
Construction started on September 28, 2015. As of December 2017, the steel foundations are under construction with above-ground structures now visible.

It has been under construction since 2015 and is expected to be completed between 2020 and 2022.

December 2017 - Most of the towers have their steel foundations above street level.

See also
List of tallest buildings in China

References

External links
 

Buildings and structures under construction in China
Skyscrapers in Haikou
Skyscraper office buildings in China
Residential skyscrapers in China
Skyscraper hotels in China